The 2009 mid-year rugby union tests (also known as the Summer Internationals in the Northern Hemisphere) refers to the rugby union Internationals played from 23 May to 4 July 2009, mostly in the Southern Hemisphere.

The main event in the series was the Lions tour of South Africa, which involved three test matches, while France and Italy travelled to Oceania.

For Australia, New Zealand and South Africa the Tests also constituted preparation for the 2009 Tri Nations. There was also a short tour for the Barbarians, including their first ever match in Australia. The two main North American sides, Canada and the United States, used the series as preparation for their annual early-summer competition, the Churchill Cup, and for their 2011 Rugby World Cup qualifying tie in July.

England played home matches against the Barbarians and Argentina and then travelled to Argentina for a return match with the Pumas, while Ireland and Wales went to North America. The first England-Argentina matchup was notable because the Argentine Rugby Union moved the game to England in effort to raise cash to help support their fledgling professional setup; the move was also convenient for their large contingent of European-based players.

Overview

Series

Notes:
 France and New Zealand drew their tour as France won the first test, but New Zealand won the second test, making a tour result of 1–1.

Other tours

Fixtures

See also
Mid-year rugby union test series
2009 end-of-year rugby union tests
2009 British & Irish Lions tour to South Africa
2009 Asian Five Nations
2009 IRB Churchill Cup
2009 IRB Pacific Nations Cup
2009 IRB Nations Cup

Notes and references

2009
2008–09 in European rugby union
2009–10 in European rugby union
2009 in Oceanian rugby union
2009 in South American rugby union
2009 in North American rugby union
2009 in South African rugby union